"Make a Move on Me" is a song recorded by singer Olivia Newton-John for her eleventh studio album. Physical (1981). It was written by John Farrar and Tom Snow, and produced by the former. The follow-up single to the number-one hit "Physical", it was released in January 1982 and peaked at number five on the US Billboard Hot 100 that April. It also became her twelfth and final single to be certified Gold by the Recording Industry Association of America (RIAA).

In Canada, "Make a Move on Me" reached number four on the pop chart and number two for two weeks on the Adult Contemporary chart. It was blocked from the top spot on that chart by "Key Largo" by Bertie Higgins.

Record World said that John's "saucy vocal solicitation and John Farrar's production make pop-A/C magic."

Juliana Hatfield covered the song on her album Juliana Hatfield Sings Olivia Newton-John.

Track listing and formats
7-inch vinyl single (MCA, EMI, 1981)
 Make a Move on Me – 3:13
 Falling – 3:42

7-inch vinyl single (EMI, 1981)
 Make a Move on Me – 3:13
 Stranger's Touch – 3:49

12-inch promo single (MCA, 1981)
 Make a Move on Me – 3:17
 Make a Move on Me (extended mix) – 8:29

Charts

Weekly charts

Year-end charts

References

External links
 

1982 singles
Olivia Newton-John songs
Songs written by Tom Snow
Songs written by John Farrar
Song recordings produced by John Farrar
MCA Records singles
1981 songs